Russia: The Great War in the East 1941–1945 is a 1987 computer wargame developed and published by Strategic Studies Group.

Gameplay
Russia: The Great War in the East 1941–1945 is a game in which the Eastern Front of World War II is simulated.

Reception
M. Evan Brooks reviewed the game for Computer Gaming World, and stated that "In conclusion, Russia is the most playable simulation of the Eastern Front on the market. Innovative and interesting, any problems it has are obviated by its successes."

Reviews
Zzap! - Dec, 1987
Computer Gaming World - Dec, 1991
Commodore User Nov 1987

See also
War in Russia

References

External links
Review in Compute!'s Gazette

1987 video games
Apple II games
Commodore 64 games
Computer wargames
Strategic Studies Group games
Turn-based strategy video games
Video games about Nazi Germany
Video games developed in Australia
Video games set in the Soviet Union
World War II video games